Ganga Jamuna Ki Lalkar is a Hindi action film of Bollywood directed and produced by Kanti Shah. This film was released on 8 November 1991 under the banner of Mangla Films.

Plot
The film revolves around the clash between a female police officer and a lady dacait.

Music
"Challa Tu Le Jaa Nishaniya" - Udit Narayan, Sadhana Sargam

Cast
 Anupam Kher as Lala
 Kader Khan as Police constable
 Shagufta Ali as Ganga
 Dalip Tahil as Jwala Singh
 Goga Kapoor as Police officer
 Rajesh Vivek
 Sriprada
 Charan Deo
 Shripradha
 Seema Vaz

References

External links

1991 films
1990s Hindi-language films
Indian action thriller films
Indian rape and revenge films
Films about outlaws
Indian films about revenge
1991 action thriller films
Films directed by Kanti Shah